The Democratic Centre ( or DC) was a Croatian centre-right political party established in 2000 by former members of the Croatian Democratic Union.

History 
The party was formed in 2000 by Mate Granić and Vesna Škare-Ožbolt after they left the centre-right Croatian Democratic Union (HDZ) following the party's defeat in the January 2000 election and Mate Granić's defeat in the February 2000 presidential race. Upon their foundation DC described themselves as a "modern democratic popular party with a European orientation, and a party of a strong civil society".

Following HDZ's return to power in the 2003 general election, DC (which had been informally allied with HDZ during the election) gained a single seat in the Croatian Parliament and a single ministerial post in the Croatian Government. Vesna Škare-Ožbolt, the party's leader and their only representative elected to parliament, was appointed Justice Minister in the Cabinet of Ivo Sanader I. She held the post from December 2003 to February 2006, when she was forced to step down by Prime Minister Ivo Sanader following allegations that she leaked information to the media, although some media pundits ascribed her resignation to her prominent public stance and ministerial results which overshadowed HDZ ministers. Since then, DC has been as an opposition party.

Since October 2002, the Democratic Centre is an observer member of the European People's Party (EPP).

In the 2007 general elections DC ran independently, entering coalition agreements with the Green Party in some constituencies. They failed to win any seats in the 153-seat parliament. Vesna Škare-Ožbolt also ran for President in the 2009–10 election as a formally independent candidate but only managed to win 37,373 or 1.89% of votes in the first round, finishing 11th out of 12 candidates.

On November 6, 2015, Vesna Škare Ožbolt and Tomislav Karamarko signed an Agreement on the Accession of the members of the Democratic Centre to the Croatian Democratic Union by which DC merged into Croatian Democratic Union. DC was struck from the register of political parties in April 2016.

Election history

Legislative 
The following is a summary of the party's results in legislative elections for the Croatian parliament. The "Total votes" and "Percentage" columns include sums of votes won by pre-election coalitions DC had been part of and the "Total seats" column includes sums of seats won by DC in election constituencies.

European Parliament

References

External links 
  

Croatian Democratic Union
Political parties established in 2000
Conservative parties in Croatia
2000 establishments in Croatia
Classical liberal parties
Centrist parties in Croatia